This list deals with those who are notable in the history or culture of all Methodist churches. For other Methodists who are not notable in Methodist history or culture, see :Category:Methodists.

Early leaders
John Wesley
Charles Wesley
George Whitefield
Richard Allen
Francis Asbury
Reverend Zachariah Munsey
Reverend David Munsey
Thomas Coke
William Law
William Williams Pantycelyn
Howell Harris
James Varick
Countess of Huntingdon

Early women preachers
Alice Cambridge
Ann Carr
Sarah Crosby
Mary Bosanquet Fletcher
Anne Lutton
Phoebe Palmer
Agnes Smyth

Clergy
Bernhard Anderson – Old Testament scholar
Ephraim Kingsbury Avery – New England minister long thought to be the first American clergyman tried for murder
Elihu Bailey – Wisconsin State Assemblyman
Canaan Banana – first President of Zimbabwe
John C. A. Barrett – Chairman of the World Methodist Council
William Black (Methodist) – linked to Nova Scotia
Henry Boehm – centenarian
William Bramwell – 1790s revivalist preacher in Yorkshire
George Bramwell Evens – nature writer of the Romani people
Rev. Dr. Henry Brown – Methodist minister and author of The Impending Peril: Or, Methodism and Amusement
William Gannaway Brownlow – Governor of Tennessee
Byron Cage – gospel singer (African Methodist Episcopal Church)
Thomas Charles – Welsh language author. (Of the Calvinistic Methodists)
Zerah Colburn (math prodigy) – became a minister, after youth as a mental calculator
Walter T. Colquitt – circuit-riding Methodist preacher who served in the US House of Representatives and the Senate.
Thomas Mears Eddy – pastor 
William Edwards (architect) – Welsh designer of bridges
Edward Eggleston – also author
Calvin Fairbank – abolitionist
Robert Newton Flew – theologian and ecumenist
Wallace Wattles – New Thought pioneer, theologian and Christian Socialist - Famous for inspiring the blockbuster book, The Secret by Rhonda Byrne. Author of Science of Getting Rich bestselling book 1910. Possibly the biggest selling author in the 20th and 21st Century who was a Methodist minister. 
Richard Watson – theology and president of the Methodist Conference
Orange Scott – first president of the Wesleyan Methodist Connexion
Adam Crooks – Wesleyan Methodist Connexion
Arno Clemens Gaebelein – also a writer
Leslie Griffiths – life peer in the House of Lords
Adam Hamilton (pastor) – senior pastor of the 17,000-member United Methodist Church of the Resurrection in Leawood, Kansas
Harold P. Hamilton – Kentucky Wesleyan College President
Hill, Rowland – founder of Surrey Chapel, London and early advocate of vaccination
Silas Hocking – novelist and preacher
Jabez Bunting – President of the Methodist Conference
John Hogan – U.S. Congressman and preacher
Andrew Hunter (Methodist preacher) – "Father of Arkansas Methodism" and a politician
Leonard Isitt (minister) – New Zealand Methodist minister
James W. Kemp – minister known for writing about Dr. Seuss as he relates to Christianity
Samuel Kobia – General Secretary of the World Council of Churches
Lowen Kruse – Nebraska state senator
Augustus Baldwin Longstreet – known as a humorist
William Losee – Canadian circuit rider
Sarah Mallett – preacher
William Morley Punshon – preaching/lecturing
Kathleen Richardson, Baroness Richardson of Calow – first woman president of the Methodist Conference
Egerton Ryerson –  The former Ryerson University (now Toronto Metropolitan University) was named after for him
William Ryerson – political figure
Tex Sample – sociologist of religion
William J. Simmons – founder of the second Ku Klux Klan (suspended minister)
Ndabaningi Sithole – founder of the Zimbabwe African National Union and a Methodist minister.
John Karefa-Smart – leader of the United National People's Party of Sierra Leone
Donald Soper – Christian socialist and pacifist
Edward Sugden – first master of Queen's College (University of Melbourne)
Wilbur Fisk Tillett – clergyman and educator
Charles Tindley – gospel music composer
Channing Heggie Tobias – member of the President's Committee on Civil Rights
Simon Topping – activist on poverty causes like Make Poverty History
Don Wildmon – Methodist pastor; founder of the conservative activist group American Family Association
Cecil Williams – involved in HIV/AIDS causes

Bishops

 Richard Allen – founder of African Methodist Episcopal Church 
 Sarah Allen – AME, founded the Daughters of the Conference
 Daniel Payne – AME, first African-American president of an African-American university, Wilberforce University
 Richard Whatcoat – third bishop of the American Methodist Episcopal Church

Missionaries
Henry Appenzeller — missionary to Korea
Henry Augustus Buchtel – did missionary work in Bulgaria, also a Governor of Colorado.
Charles Cowman – missionary to Japan
Lettie Cowman – missionary to Japan
Henry Hare Dugmore – Wesleyan missionary and translator in South Africa
James Endicott – missionary to Sichuan, Western China
Alexander Robert Edgar – missionary to Australia. (convert from Anglicanism)
Ailie Gale – missionary to China
E. Stanley Jones — missionary to India
Leslie Gifford Kilborn – missionary to Sichuan, Western China
Omar Leslie Kilborn – missionary to Sichuan, Western China
James Hope Moulton – missionary known for studying/preaching to the Parsis
Christoph Gottlob Müller – founded the Wesleyan Church in Germany.
John Hunt (missionary) – one of the earliest missionaries in Fiji.
Mary Reed – missionary to the lepers of India
George Scott – missionary to Sweden

Theologians

 John B. Cobb, Jr. (b. 1925) – American scholar, process theologian and pioneer ecotheologian
 James H. Cone (b. 1938) – advocate of Black theology
 Albert Outler (1908–1989) – Wesleyan scholar who formulated the Wesleyan Quadrilateral

Laity

Politicians

Ulysses S. Grant – 18th President of the United States (1869–77)
William McKinley – 25th President of the United States (1897-1901)
George W. Bush - 43rd President of the United States (2001-2009)
Alben W. Barkley - 35th Vice-President of the United States (1949–53)
Dick Cheney - 46th Vice-President of the United States (2001–09)
Chiang Kai-shek - Premier of China (1930–31, 1935–38, 1939–45, 1947) and President of the Republic of China (1948–49, 1950–75), the longest-serving non-royal ruler of China, having held the post for 46 years.
Syngman Rhee - first President of Republic of Korea (1948–60)
Nelson Mandela – President of South Africa (1994–99), South African anti-apartheid revolutionary, political leader, and philanthropist. 
Boris Trajkovski – second President of the Republic of Macedonia (1999-2004) and President of the Church Council of the Macedonian Evangelical Methodist Church.
David Hallam – British Member of the European Parliament and Methodist Local Preacher
Paul Boateng – lay preacher who became Britain's first black Cabinet minister in 1997
Colin Breed – lay preacher and British Liberal Democrat Shadow Cabinet member
Minnie Fisher Cunningham – helped found a Methodist church in New Waverly, Texas; political figure who worked to uplift the standard of living for the disenfranchised
Isaac Foot – Vice President of the Methodist Conference (1937–38) and President of the Liberal Party (UK) (1947)
John Karefa-Smart – Sierra Leonese foreign minister and Methodist elder
Robert Newbald Kay – British Liberal MP. Also a member of the Methodist Conference who was important to the Methodist chapel in Acomb, North Yorkshire.
Winnie Mandela- South African anti-apartheid revolutionary, political leader and social worker who was the wife of Nelson Mandela from 1958-1996.
Edmund Marshall – Methodist local preacher, ecumenical adviser to the Bishop of Wakefield and former MP.
Florence Paton – lay preacher, British Labour party
Newton Rowell – leading lay figure in Canada's Methodist church and a politician
Soong May-ling – First Lady of the Republic of China, wife of Chiang Kai-shek
Frederick Stewart (Australian politician) – Australian Cabinet minister and lay preacher
Taufa'ahau Tupou IV – lay preacher in the Free Wesleyan Church and former King of Tonga
Feng Yuxiang – General of the Zhili Clique and later founder of the Guominjun, known as the "Christian General" and "Backstabbing General"

Women lay leaders
Belle Harris Bennett (1852–1922) – missionary and suffragist from Richmond Kentucky who led the Southern Methodist Church reform giving women full laity rights in 1919
Eliza Bennis (1725–1802) – early Irish convert (1769) and leader in Limerick and Waterford
Eliza Clark Garrett (1805–1855) – Chicago-based leader who founded the Garrett Bible Institute seminary.
Freer Helen Latham (1907–1987) - Australian, president of World Federation of Methodist Women

Educators
Dr. Henry N. Snyder (1865–1949) – educator and author who served as president of Wofford College, Spartanburg, SC from 1902 until his retirement in 1942

Entertainers
Beyoncé – American singer
Brian Courtney Wilson – American gospel and CCM singer
Brittany Hargest – member of CCM group Jump5
Toni Gonzaga and Alex Gonzaga – Filipina television personalities/recording artists

Scientists
Charles Coulson – became Vice-President of the British Methodist Conference in 1959 and won chemistry's Davy Medal in 1970.
Ernest Walton – Irish physicist and Nobel laureate in Physics
William Daniel Phillips – Nobel Prize–winning physicist and a founding member of the "International Society for Science & Religion"
Arthur Leonard Schawlow – co-winner of the 1981 Nobel Prize in Physics

Writers (including hymn writers)
William F. Albright – Methodist archeologist who writes on Bible archaeology
Jennie M. Bingham — American author
Emily Rose Bleby – Jamaican/British social reformer
Adda Burch — American teacher, missionary, activist, reporter
Marietta Stanley Case (1845-1900), American poet and temperance advocate
Samuel Chadwick – The Way to Pentecost
Fanny Crosby – American mission worker, poet, lyricist, and composer
Elizabeth Litchfield Cunnyngham (1831-1911), American missionary, church worker, editor, translator
Nannie Webb Curtis (1861-1920), American essayist, editor (convert from Baptist)
Susanna M. D. Fry (1841–1920), American writer, editor
Ann Griffiths – poet and hymn writer (convert from Anglicanism)
Phoebe Knapp – Methodist hymn writer
Harper Lee – American author who wrote To Kill a Mockingbird
William Williams Pantycelyn – Welsh Methodist hymn writer (Calvinistic Methodist and preacher)
Amy Parkinson (1855-1938), Canadian poet, hymnwriter
Emma Rood Tuttle (1839–1916) — American author

Fictional characters

Superman – also known as Clark Kent or Kal-El. Superman is the archetypal costumed super-hero. He is clearly the most influential character in the comic book super-hero genre. The character was created by Jerry Siegel and Joe Shuster, both of whom were Jewish. The character of Superman, however, has always been depicted as having been raised with a solidly Protestant upbringing by his adoptive Midwestern parents – Jonathan and Martha Kent. Of Clark's parents, Martha is the more devout churchgoer. Clark Kent was raised as a Methodist. The Kents are Methodists, although Jonathan is not as regular a churchgoer as his wife.
Superboy – also known as Conner Kent or Kon-El Superboy is a clone made from the DNA of Superman (who was raised as a Methodist) and Lex Luthor (a Nietzschean atheist). Superboy was being raised by Jonathan and Martha Kent, who were also the adoptive parents of Clark Kent, the Kryptonian infant orphan who grew up to be Superman.
Jonathan and Martha Kent – Clark and Conner Kent's adopted parents.
Supergirl – real name is Linda Danvers, the fictional character of Supergirl (the post-Crisis version written prominently by Peter David during the late 1980s and 1990s) was an active Methodist. Supergirl's minister, Rev. Larry Varvel, was based on a real-life Methodist minister of the same name.
Hank, Peggy, and Bobby Hill along with majority of King of the Hill characters – attend Arlen First Methodist Church.
Amanda Waller – also known as The Wall, White Queen, and Black King—leader of the Suicide Squad and Checkmate
Samuel and Rose Sayer – Methodist missionaries played by Robert Morley and Katharine Hepburn in John Huston's film adaption of C. S. Forester's novel, The African Queen.
Scout Finch – Main character of To Kill a Mockingbird, by Harper Lee. The Finch family is described in the first chapter as descended from an English Methodist, Simon Finch, who fled religious persecution and emigrated to Alabama. The Finches are also described as attending Maycomb's Methodist church, in contrast to other characters, such as Miss Maudie Atkins (Baptist) and Calpurnia (AME).

 
Methodists